Sulev is an Estonian masculine given name.

People named Sulev include:
Sulev Alajõe (born 1965), politician and lecturer
Sulev Iva (born 1969), Võro identity activist
Sulev Kannimäe (born 1955), Estonian politician
Sulev Keedus (born 1957), film director
Sulev Luik (1954–1997), actor
Sulev Mäeltsemees (born 1947), social scientist and scholar
Sulev Nõmmik (1931–1992), theatre and movie director, actor, humorist and comedian
Sulev Oll (born 1964), journalist and poet
Sulev Teppart (born 1960), actor
Sulev Vahtre (born 1926–2007), historian
Sulev Valner (born 1965), journalist (:et)
Sulev Vare (born 1962), politician

References

Estonian masculine given names